The 2019 Jinan International Open was a professional tennis tournament played on outdoor hard courts. It was the third (men) and second (women) editions of the tournament which was part of the 2019 ATP Challenger Tour and the 2019 ITF Women's World Tennis Tour. It took place in Jinan, China between 26 August and 8 September 2019.

Men's singles main-draw entrants

Seeds

 1 Rankings are as of 26 August 2019.

Other entrants
The following players received wildcards into the singles main draw:
  Cui Jie
  Gao Xin
  He Yecong
  Wu Di
  Zhang Zhizhen

The following player received entry into the singles main draw as an alternate:
  Sun Fajing

The following players received entry from the qualifying draw:
  Evan Song
  Renta Tokuda

The following player received entry as a lucky loser:
  Jin Yuquan

Women's singles main-draw entrants

Seeds

 1 Rankings are as of 19 August 2019.

Other entrants
The following players received wildcards into the singles main draw:
  Cao Siqi
  Wu Meixu
  Yuan Chengyiyi
  Zheng Wushuang

The following players received entry from the qualifying draw:
  Lou Brouleau
  Guo Hanyu
  Erika Sema
  Eden Silva
  Aldila Sutjiadi
  Wang Meiling
  Wu Ho-ching
  Zuzana Zlochová

Champions

Men's singles

 Zhang Zhizhen def.  Go Soeda 7–5, 2–6, 6–4.

Women's singles

 You Xiaodi def.  Kaylah McPhee, 6–3, 7–6(7–5)

Men's doubles

 Matthew Ebden /  Divij Sharan def.  Nam Ji-sung /  Song Min-kyu 7–6(7–4), 5–7, [10–3].

Women's doubles

 Yuan Yue /  Zheng Wushuang def.  Samantha Murray /  Eden Silva, 1–6, 6–4, [10–7]

References

External links
 2019 Jinan International Open at ITFtennis.com

2019 ATP Challenger Tour
2019 ITF Women's World Tennis Tour
2019 in Chinese tennis
Jinan International Open
August 2019 sports events in China
September 2019 sports events in China